Reham Al-Farra (1974–2003) was a Palestinian diplomat and journalist who was murdered in the Canal Hotel bombing in 2003. She had served as a Minister of Public Information and for the UN Office for the Coordination of Humanitarian Affairs.

Early life and education
Al-Farra was born in Kuwait, and graduated from the Faculty of Mass Communications in Yarmouk University.

Career
Al-Farra worked as a journalist at Shihan weekly newspaper and later became the editor of the same. She was the youngest Columnist in Jordan to write a daily column in Al-Arab Al-Yawm for four consecutive years.

In 2002, Al-Farra joined the United Nations Department of Public Information and was nominated later as an Arabic spokesperson for the UN operations in Iraq. She had also been active at the Center for Defending Freedom of Journalists.

Death
Al-Farra was killed along with other United Nations staff members in the terrorist Canal Hotel bombing of the UN Headquarters in Baghdad, Iraq on 19 August 2003.

Honours
In September 2003, the UN Department of Public Information decided to rename its annual training programme for young journalists “The Reham Al-Farra Memorial Journalists' Fellowship Programme” in memory of her.

On 19 September 2003, former UN Secretary-General Kofi Annan paid tribute to Al-Farra during a memorial ceremony for those killed in Baghdad: “You chose to work for the United Nations because you wanted to do something for others," Annan said. "You went to Iraq to make a contribution to the lives of your Arab brothers and sisters. It is their loss as much as ours that you were denied the chance to do that".

References

1974 births
2003 deaths
Jordanian officials of the United Nations
Yarmouk University alumni
Jordanian journalists
People killed in the Canal Hotel bombing
Civilian casualties in the Iraq War
20th-century journalists